Coloanal anastomosis is a surgical procedure in which the colon is attached to the anus after the rectum has been removed. Also called coloanal pull-through.

References

External links 
 Coloanal anastomosis entry in the public domain NCI Dictionary of Cancer Terms

Digestive system surgery